is a fictional monster, or kaiju, that first appeared in episode 26 of Tsuburaya Productions' 1966 series Ultraman.

Overview 

Name 
Gomora's name likely comes from a combination of Godzilla and Mothra's Japanese names.

Shōwa period 
Gomora debuts in episode 26 of the original Ultraman series, in which it is a descendant of the Gomorasaurus species and escapes Scientists that attempt to display him at the Osaka Expo. It was one of the few creatures to defeat Ultraman. It would lose to Ultraman in a second fight.

Development 
Gomora was designed by Tohl Narita, who based the monster's head on the helmet of the Kuroda Nagamasa.

Appearances

Film 

 Ultraman (1967) stock footage cameo
The 6 Ultra Brothers vs. the Monster Army (1974)
 Mega Monster Battle: Ultra Galaxy (2009)
 Ultra Galaxy Legend Side Story: Ultraman Zero vs. Darklops Zero (2010)
 Ultraman Zero Side Story: Killer the Beatstar (2011)
 Ultraman Ginga Theater Special: Ultra Monster Hero Battle Royal! (2014)

Television 

 Ultraman (1966)
 Ultra Fight (1970)

 Redman (1972)
 Ultraman 80 (1980)
 Ultraman: The Ultimate Hero (1995)
 Ultraman Max (2005)
 Ultraman Mebius (2006)
 Ultra Galaxy Mega Monster Battle (2007)
 Ultra Galaxy Mega Monster Battle: Never Ending Odyssey (2008)
 Ultraman Ginga (2013)
 Ultraman Ginga S (2014)
 Ultraman X (2015)
 Ultraman Orb (2016)
 Ultraman Geed (2017)
 Ultraman R/B (2018)
 Ultraman Z (2020)

References

External links 
 Gomora profile

Ultra Series characters
Fictional giants
Kaiju
Fictional monsters
Television characters introduced in 1967
Fictional reptiles
Fictional dinosaurs